Eva Wutti (born 26 February 1989) is an Austrian professional racing cyclist. She rides for the No Radunion Vitalogic team.

See also
 List of 2015 UCI Women's Teams and riders

References

External links

1989 births
Living people
Austrian female cyclists
Place of birth missing (living people)
21st-century Austrian women